Nicola Ercolani (born 10 November 1969) is a Sammarinese alpine skier. He competed at the 1988, 1992 and the 1994 Winter Olympics.

References

1969 births
Living people
Sammarinese male alpine skiers
Olympic alpine skiers of San Marino
Alpine skiers at the 1988 Winter Olympics
Alpine skiers at the 1992 Winter Olympics
Alpine skiers at the 1994 Winter Olympics
Place of birth missing (living people)